Rugby union at the 1963 South Pacific Games was played as a double round-robin with 3 men's teams competing. No finals were played and a complete set of gold, silver and bronze medals were awarded to the teams as per their finishing positions. Fiji was unbeaten in the tournament and were presented with their gold medals by the Governor of Fiji.

Medal summary

Men's tournament

Standings
Final standings after the round robin tournament:

Matches

See also
Rugby union at the Pacific Games

References

Rugby union
1963
International rugby union competitions hosted by Fiji
1963 rugby union tournaments for national teams
Samoa national rugby union team matches
Fiji national rugby union team matches
Tonga national rugby union team matches